Ystradfellte is a village and community in Powys, Wales, about  north of Hirwaun, with 556 inhabitants. It belongs to the historic county of Brecknockshire (Breconshire) and the Fforest Fawr area of the Brecon Beacons National Park, beside the Afon Mellte river. The village is linked by minor roads with Heol Senni to the north and the A4059 north of Penderyn, and with Pontneddfechan, which lies in the community, at the head of the Vale of Neath to the south.

History
Ystradfellte is chiefly known in history as the place where the Welsh nobleman and rebel leader Llywelyn Bren surrendered at the end of his revolt of 1316. Llywelyn gave himself up on the condition that his men be spared, but was himself put to death in 1318 at Cardiff.

The village was connected to mains electricity in 1960, as one of the last communities in the whole of England and Wales to be wired. Outlying properties in the Nedd Fechan valley had to wait until December 2005 for their connection.

Features
The village is a popular tourist centre for its hillwalking, waterfalls and caves along the nearby rivers. Ystradfellte has a public house, the New Inn, which provides camping facilities for visitors, and Croydon Caving Club. It comes under Aberdare for postal purposes making it the only part of Powys that Ocado deliver to. 

The surrounding area is renowned for its caves and karst scenery, making caving a popular activity. Some of the more famous caves near the village include:
Porth yr Ogof, with the biggest cave entrance in Wales, into which the River Mellte flows.
Little Neath River Cave.

The area is seen as part of Waterfall Country. A popular attraction near the village is the Waterfalls Walk, an easier walk along the Afon Mellte past two main falls on the river, Sgwd Clun-gwyn and Sgwd Isaf Clun-gwyn, to Sgwd yr Eira on the Afon Hepste, where the footpath passes behind the waterfall.

Notable people
 Evan Bevan (1803–1866), the Welsh-language poet, moved to Ystradfellte as a young adult.
 Barbara Brooke, Baroness Brooke of Ystradfellte (1908–2000), a Conservative Party politician.

References

External links
Village website
Illustrated guide to the waterfalls
Series of local photographs by Martin Wilmore Photography
Photos from Swansea University Hiking Clubs Version of the Waterfalls Walk
www.geograph.co.uk ; photos of Ystradfellte and surrounding area

Villages in Powys
Fforest Fawr
Tourist attractions in Powys